The Xbox app is an app for Windows 8, Windows 10, Windows 11, Android, iOS and Tizen. It acts as a companion app for Xbox video game consoles, providing access to Xbox network community features, remote control, as well as second screen functionality (formerly branded as SmartGlass) with selected games, applications, and content. 

On Windows 10, the app additionally serves as a launcher for PC games installed on a device (including games obtained from Microsoft Store, Bethesda.net, Battle.net, Steam, GOG.com, Epic Games Store, Humble Bundle, Origin and Ubisoft Connect), provided access to the system's screen recording functions, and streaming of games from an Xbox One console on a local network.

During E3 2019, the existing version of the Xbox app for Windows 10 was renamed Xbox Console Companion, and a new Xbox app was introduced in beta. This app is more specifically oriented towards PC gaming, serving as a front-end to games distributed on Microsoft Store, and as the client for PC Game Pass.

Features
Through the app, users can access their activity feed, Xbox Live friends and messages, manage their party, watch saved Game DVR clips, browse OneGuide, and view their achievements. Some games and apps can provide second screen integration via the app, displaying supplemental content. The app can also be used as a remote control for the console.

The Windows 10 version of Xbox Console Companion allows users to stream games from an Xbox One console over a local network, and has the ability to view and edit Game DVR recordings from an Xbox One console. It also serves as a front-end for a PC version of Game DVR on supported hardware (Game DVR settings were moved to the Settings app on Windows 10 version 1703), and has a library display for games installed on the device, such as those obtained via Microsoft Store, Bethesda.net, Battle.net, Steam, GOG.com, Epic Games Store, Humble Bundle, Origin and Ubisoft Connect.

Support for Xbox Cloud Gaming as well as Remote Play from Xbox consoles was added to the app on September 14, 2021.

History

Xbox 360 SmartGlass was originally announced at E3 2012, for Windows 8, Android and iOS. Microsoft demonstrated use cases for the new app within both games and entertainment, including a minimap for Ascend: New Gods, a second screen experience for School of Rock with supplemental content, and Game of Thrones (with interactive maps and family tree diagrams). With the release of Xbox One in November 2013, Microsoft released an accompanying Xbox One SmartGlass app for Android, iOS, Windows 8.1, and Windows Phone, which contained more extensive functionality for controlling the console.

Windows 10 introduced a revamped version of SmartGlass referred to simply as Xbox, which notably added a library display for PC games, and the ability to stream games from an Xbox One console on a local network. On June 12, 2016, the mobile versions of the Xbox One Smartglass apps were updated for parity with the desktop version, and renamed "Xbox" as well. Xbox 360 SmartGlass was not updated and was discontinued in May 2018.

The mobile apps were updated alongside the Xbox One's May 2019 software update, adding cross-platform status indicators to friends. In May 2019, Microsoft also revamped the Xbox Game Bar feature of Windows 10 into a widget-based overlay, which features pop-up windows for features such as screen recording, managing audio inputs, viewing the Xbox Live friends list, and monitoring system components.

On June 9, 2019, coinciding with Microsoft's E3 2019 press conference, Microsoft released a new Xbox app in beta exclusively for Windows 10 May 2019 Update (version 1903), which has a redesigned interface, and serves as the client for Xbox Game Pass on PC. In advance of the conference, Microsoft rebranded the existing Xbox app on Windows 10 as Xbox Console Companion. The new Xbox app is pre-loaded software on Windows 11.

See also
 PlayStation App
 Game Center
 Google Play Games
 Nintendo Switch Online
Comparison of screencasting software

References

External links
 
 Xbox (beta) on Microsoft Store
 Xbox Console Companion on Microsoft Store

Android (operating system) software
Freeware
IOS software
Screencasting software
Screenshot software
Universal Windows Platform apps
Windows Phone software
Windows software
Xbox
Xbox 360
Xbox One
Xbox network